This is a list of Members of Parliament (MPs) elected to the Assembly of the Republic for the 10th Parliament of the Turkish Republic of Northern Cyprus at the 2022 parliamentary election.

The list below indicates the MPs in the parties in which they were elected; any change of political party is indicated separately.

Lefkoşa

Gazimağusa

Girne

İskele

Güzelyurt

Lefke

References 

Members of the Assembly of the Republic (Northern Cyprus)